Fruitland is an unincorporated community in northeastern Echols County, Georgia, United States. It lies on State Route 187 to the northeast of the unincorporated community of Statenville, the county seat of Echols County. Its elevation is 161 feet (49 m).

References

Unincorporated communities in Echols County, Georgia
Unincorporated communities in Georgia (U.S. state)